Characiochloris is a genus of green algae in the family Characiochloridaceae.

References

External links

Chlamydomonadales genera
Chlamydomonadales